"America (I Love America)" is the debut single by Full Intention. It contains a sample of Patrick Juvet's 1978 hit "I Love America" and was included on Anthems II 1991-2009, a composition by Ministry of Sound. On the U.S. dance chart, it spent two weeks at number one and a total of fourteen weeks on the chart in 1996.

See also
List of number-one dance singles of 1996 (U.S.)

References

1995 songs
1996 debut singles
English house music songs
Songs written by Jacques Morali
Songs written by Victor Willis
Songs about the United States
Big Beat Records (American record label) singles